The MRF World Series for the Jawaharlal Nehru Cup was an international cricket tournament held in India to celebrate the birth centenary of Jawaharlal Nehru, first Prime Minister of India.

The tournament took place in October and November 1989, and was sponsored by the Madras Rubber Factory (MRF). Six teams took part India, the hosts, Australia, England, Pakistan, Sri Lanka and the West Indies. The tournament was a round robin with each team playing each other once.

Group stage

Semi finals

1st Semi Final
Pakistan beat England in the first semi-final. The match was reduced to 30 overs a side.

2nd Semi Final

Final

At the final at Eden Gardens, Calcutta, Desmond Haynes scored 107  as West Indies totalled 273–5. But Pakistan overhauled it, scoring 277–6, thanks to Wasim Akram's six in the last over and half centuries from Saleem Malik and captain Imran Khan who was also Man of the Series.

External links
 Nehru Cup 1989-90 scorecards on Cricinfo

1989 in Indian cricket
International cricket competitions from 1988–89 to 1991
Cricket
Sport in India
Monuments and memorials to Jawaharlal Nehru
One Day International cricket competitions